In mathematics, in the field of group theory, a metanilpotent group is a group that is nilpotent by nilpotent. In other words, it has a normal nilpotent subgroup such that the quotient group is also nilpotent.

The following are clear:

 Every metanilpotent group is a solvable group.
 Every subgroup and every quotient of a metanilpotent group is metanilpotent.

References
 J.C. Lennox, D.J.S. Robinson, The Theory of Infinite Soluble Groups, Oxford University Press, 2004, . P.27.
 D.J.S. Robinson, A Course in the Theory of Groups, GTM 80, Springer Verlag, 1996, . P.150.

Solvable groups
Properties of groups